Fețeni may refer to several villages in Romania:

 Fețeni, a village in the town of Cugir, Alba County
 Fețeni, a village in Valea Mare Commune, Dâmbovița County
 Fețeni, a village in the city of Râmnicu Vâlcea, Vâlcea County

See also 
 Fața (disambiguation)